Tyspanodes striata is a species of moth of the family Crambidae described by Arthur Gardiner Butler in 1879. It is found in China, Taiwan and Japan.

The wingspan is 26–32 mm.

References

Moths described in 1879
Spilomelinae
Moths of Japan